The 2011 Torridge District Council election took place on 5 May 2011 to elect members of Torridge District Council in Devon, England. The whole council was up for election and the council stayed under no overall control.

Background
At the previous election in 2007 no party won a majority on the council with 13 Conservative, 13 independent, 8 Liberal Democrats and 2 Green party councillors elected. However between 2007 and 2011 there were a number of changes on the council, with 3 Liberal Democrat councillors, Caroline Church, Simon Inch and Tony Inch, quitting the party in July 2007 to sit as independents. All 3 would then join the Conservatives, with Simon and Tony Inch joining the Conservatives in April 2010 to back the local Conservative Member of Parliament Geoffrey Cox at the 2010 general election. There were also 2 by-elections in 2009, with the Liberal Democrats gaining a seat in Hartland and Bradworthy from an independent, but also losing a seat in Holsworthy to another independent.

11 of the 36 councillors stood down at the election, including the leader of the Conservative council James Morrish. A total of 80 candidates stood at the election for the 36 seats contested, 25 Conservatives, 23 Liberal Democrats, 18 independents, 6 Labour and 4 each from the Green Party and UK Independence Party. 3 independent candidates were elected with no opposition, Phil Pennington in Monkleigh and Littleham, Ken James in Tamarside and David Lausen in Winkleigh, down from 7 unopposed candidates at the 2007 election. Meanwhile, Len Ford, who had represented Appledore as a Liberal Democrat councillor, had left the party and contested Bideford East as an independent.

Election result
The Conservatives won half of the seats on the council, falling 1 seat short of winning a majority. This was the closest any political party had come to having a majority since the first election to the council in 1973. Overall turnout at the election was 45.2%, up from 42.1% in 2007. This ranged from a high of 57.2% in Three Moors to a low of 32.3% in Bideford South.

Independents dropped to 10 councillors, while the Liberal Democrats rose to 6 seats and the Greens won 1 seat. Meanwhile, Labour won their first seat on the council since 2003, after David Brenton gained a seat in Bideford South from the mayor of Bideford, Conservative Philip Pester. He was one of 14 new councillors after the election.

Following the election Conservative Barry Parsons became the new leader of the council.

Ward results

By-elections between 2011 and 2015

Shebbear and Langtree
A by-election was held in Shebbear and Langtree ward on 15 August 2013 after Conservative councillor John Lewis resigned from the council. David Hurley held the seat for the Conservatives with a majority of 23 votes.

Torrington
A by-election was held in Torrington ward after Liberal Democrat councillor Geoff Lee resigned from the council due to leaving the area. The seat was gained for the Green party by Cathrine Simmons with a majority of 111 votes.

Bideford East
A by-election was held in Bideford East ward on 20 March 2014 after the death of independent councillor Steve Clarke. The seat was won by another independent Sam Robinson by a majority of 145 votes.

Kenwith
A by-election was held on 10 July 2014 for Kenwith ward after independent councillor Kathy Murdoch resigned from the council. Kathy Murdoch had been elected as a Conservative but left the party to sit as an independent in June 2012. The seat was gained for the Conservatives by Alison Boyle with a majority of 37 votes.

References

2011
2011 English local elections
2010s in Devon